Bohdan Paczyński or Bohdan Paczynski (8 February 1940 – 19 April 2007) was a Polish astronomer notable in the theory of the stellar evolution, accretion discs, and gamma ray bursts.

Life
Paczyński was born on 8 February 1940 in Vilnius, Lithuania, to a lawyer and a teacher of Polish literature. In 1945 his family chose to leave for Poland and settled in Kraków, and then in 1949 in Warsaw. At the age of 18, Paczyński published his first scientific article in Acta Astronomica. Between 1959 and 1962 he studied astronomy at the University of Warsaw. Two years later he received a doctorate under the tutelage of Stefan Piotrowski and Włodzimierz Zonn.

In 1962 Paczyński became a member of the Centre of Astronomy of the Polish Academy of Sciences, where he continued to work for nearly 20 years. In 1974 he received habilitation and in 1979 became a professor. Thanks to his works on theoretical astronomy, at the age of 36 he became the youngest member of the Polish Academy of Sciences.

In 1981 Paczyński visited the United States, where he gave a series of lectures at Caltech to former interns at his Warsaw-based institute. After the introduction of the Martial Law in Poland he decided to stay abroad. He was the Lyman Spitzer Jr. Professor of Astrophysics at Princeton University.

Paczyński was the initiator of time-domain sky surveys: Optical Gravitational Lensing Experiment (OGLE, led by Andrzej Udalski of Warsaw University Observatory) and All Sky Automated Survey (ASAS, created together with Grzegorz Pojmański).

His new methods of discovering cosmic objects and measuring their mass by using gravitational lenses gained him international recognition, and he is acknowledged for coining the term microlensing. He was also an early proponent of the idea that gamma-ray bursts are at cosmological distances.

His research concentrated on stellar evolution, gravitational lensing and gravitational microlensing, variable stars, gamma-ray bursts, and galactic structure.

In 1999, he became the first astronomer to receive all three major awards of the Royal Astronomical Society, by winning the Gold Medal, having won the Eddington Medal in 1987 and the George Darwin Lectureship in 1995.

He was honoured with the title of doctor honoris causa by Wrocław University in Poland (on June 29, 2005) and Nicolaus Copernicus University in Toruń in Poland (on September 22, 2006).

In January 2006 he was awarded Henry Norris Russell Lectureship of the American Astronomical Society, "for his highly original contributions to a wide variety of fields including advanced stellar evolution, the nature of gamma ray bursts,  accretion in binary systems, gravitational lensing, and cosmology. His research has been distinguished by its creativity and breadth, as well as the stimulus it has provided to highly productive observational investigations".

He died of brain cancer on April 19, 2007 in Princeton, New Jersey.

Honors
Awards
Karl Schwarzschild Medal of Astronomische Gesellschaft (1981)
Jurzykowski Prize (1982)
Eddington Medal (1987)
Heineman Prize (1992)
Prize of the Foundation for Polish Science (1996)
Henry Draper Medal of the National Academy of Sciences (1997)
Gold Medal of the Royal Astronomical Society (1999)
Bruno Rossi Prize (2000)
Bruce Medal (2002)
Henry Norris Russell Lectureship (2006)
Commander's Cross with Star of the Order of Polonia Restituta (2007)
Named after him
 Asteroid 11755 Paczynski
 One of ASAS-SN telescopes, located in CTIO, Chile 
 Bohdan Paczynski Visitor program, Princeton University. Past scholars include Joachim Wambsganss (2008), Yasushi Suto (2009), Steven Balbus (2010).
 Bohdan Paczyński Medal of the Polish Astronomical Society

See also
 List of Poles#Astronomy
 Paczyński–Wiita potential

References

External links
 Bohdan Paczynski's web page
 Bohdan Paczyński awarded with the title of doctor honoris causa by Wrocław University  
 
 Bruce T. Draine, "Bohdan Paczynski", Biographical Memoirs of the National Academy of Sciences

1940 births
2007 deaths
20th-century Polish astronomers
Gravitational lensing
University of Warsaw alumni
Princeton University faculty
Scientists from Vilnius
Deaths from brain cancer in the United States
Deaths from cancer in New Jersey
Recipients of the Gold Medal of the Royal Astronomical Society
Winners of the Dannie Heineman Prize for Astrophysics
Recipients of the Order of Polonia Restituta
Foreign associates of the National Academy of Sciences
Recipients of the State Award Badge (Poland)
21st-century Polish astronomers